George F. Cahill (1869–1935) was an American inventor who made night baseball games possible by inventing glareless duplex floodlight projectors.

References 

1869 births
1935 deaths
American inventors
People from Holyoke, Massachusetts
Baseball people